Karl Koch (30 June 1910 – 28 June 1944) was a German cyclist. He competed in the individual road race event at the 1928 Summer Olympics. He was killed in action during World War II.

References

External links
 

1910 births
1944 deaths
People from Alsfeld
Sportspeople from Giessen (region)
People from the Grand Duchy of Hesse
German male cyclists
Olympic cyclists of Germany
Cyclists at the 1928 Summer Olympics
German military personnel killed in World War II
Cyclists from Hesse